Always and Forever may refer to:

Books
Always and Forever, a children's book illustrated by Debi Gliori

Film and TV
Always & Forever (film), a 1991 Swiss film
"Always and Forever", an episode of the TV series The Jamie Foxx Show

Music

Albums 
Always & Forever (Eternal album)
Always & Forever (Randy Travis album)
Always and Forever (Silk album), or the title song (see below)
Always and Forever (Alien Ant Farm album)
Always & Forever: The Classics an album by Luther Vandross, or the title song (see below)
Always and Forever, an album by Planetshakers, or the title song
Always and Forever Volume 1, and Always and Forever Volume 2, by Funker Vogt
Always and Forever, by Mr. Capone-E

Songs
"Always and Forever" (Heatwave song), also covered by Luther Vandross, Silk and other artists
"Always and Forever" (Kostas Martakis song)
"Always and Forever", a song by JJ72 from I to Sky
"Always and Forever (BFF)", a song by Raze from That's the Way

See also
"Always Forever", a song by Bryson Tiller
Forever and Always (disambiguation)